Jenny Martin may refer to:
 Jenny Beth Martin, co-founder and national coordinator of the Tea Party Patriots
 Jennifer L. Martin, Australian scientist
 Jenny Martin (All My Children)